Peter Whitford (born 1939) is an Australian former radio, theatre, television and film character actor known for numerous roles particularly as wealthy businessmen and members of the aristocracy.

Peter Whitford was born in Adelaide, South Australia. He graduated from NIDA in 1963.  In his early career, he played Jack Parker in the long-running radio serial Blue Hills.

Whitford an actor, playwright, director and singer started his career firstly in radio roles and subsequently in the theatre genre in 1958, but has appeared in numerous TV and film roles, stating from the late 1960s until 2010.

Film roles
 The Tichborne Affair (1975) as Cubitt
 Cass (1978) as Frank
 My Brilliant Career (1979) as Uncle Julius
 Phar Lap (1983) as Bert Wolfe
 Careful, He Might Hear You  (1983) as George
 With Prejudice (1983) as Bodor
 Who Killed Hannah Jane? (1984) as James Gannon
 Dead End Drive-In (1986) as Thompson 
 Running from the Guns (1987) as Terry
 Warm Nights on a Slow Moving Train (1988) as Steward
 Computer Ghosts (1988) as Uncle Oscar
 Strictly Ballroom (1992) as Les Kendall
 The Time Game (1992) as Mr Green
 The Burning Piano: A Portrait of Patrick White (1993) as Self
 Dad and Dave: On Our Selection (1995) as Mr Todd
 Oscar and Lucinda (1997) as Mr Ahearn
 Passion (1999) as Tour Manager
 The Three Stooges (1999) as Dell Henderson (Administrator)
 Moulin Rouge! (2001) as Stage Manager
 The Man Who Sued God (2001) as Moderator
 Black and White (2002) as Justice Windeyer
 Unfolding Florence: The Many Lives of Florence Broadhurst (2006) as Voice
 Fool’s Gold (2008) as Judge

Television roles
 66 and All Thar (1966) as Self & Various
 Australian Playhouse (1967)
 Contrabandits (1967-68) as Doorman, Waiter & Bingo
 I’ve Married A Bachelor (1968-69) as Peter Prentice
 The Link Men (1970) as Seaman
 The Rovers (1970) as Rogers
 Mrs. Finnegan (1970) as Clarrie Mooresfield
 The Godfathers (1971) as Dusty Rhodes
 Homicide (1968-73) as Ward & Johnny Tate
 Division 4 (1970-75) as Brian Doherty, Neil Henderson & Peter Johnson
 The Company Men (mini-series) (1975)
 Ryan (1973) as Billy Maxwell
 Number 96 (1976) as Guy Sutton
 The Restless Years (1977) as Maurice Brown
 Chopper Squad (1978) as Poof
 Case for the Defence (1978) as Institution Director
 Skyways (1979) as Nigel Forsythe 
 Home Sweet Home (mini-series) (1980) as Mike Furnont
 Water Under the Bridge (mini-series) (1980) as T.C. Shallicott
 Prisoner (1981) as Det Sgt Gordon
 Cop Shop (1981) as Father Daniel Monahan
 Carson’s Law (1983-84) as Don Randall & Inspector Hudson
 Five Mile Creek (1984) as Mr Anderson
 Sweet and Sour (1984) as Audition Director
 Kingswood Country (1980 & 1984) as Hayden De Witt & Bill the Salesman
 A Country Practice (1982 & 1984) as Roger McLean & Alwyn Watson
 The Last Bastion (mini-series) (1984) as H. V. Evatt
 Bodyline (1984) as Robertson
 Mother and Son (1985) as Minister
 Butterfly Island (1985) as Fred
 Winners (1985) as Mr Donaldson
 The Henderson Kids (1985) as Ashley Wheeler
 Prime Time (1986) as Charles Garrett
 Flight into Hell (mini-series) (1987)
 Rafferty’s Rules (1987 & 1989) as William Walker & Harmon
 Australians (mini-series) (1988) as Mr Crosby
 The Flying Doctors (1990) as Robert Bell
 Come In Spinner (mini-series) (1990) as Mr Sharlton
 Police Rescue (1992) as Russell
 E Street (1993) as Dr John Halliday
 Blood Brothers (1993)
 Under the Skin (1994)
 Home and Away (1989, 1994–95) as Mick O’Reilly & Doctor Worthington 
 Blue Heelers (1997) as Bernie Cochren 
 Bullpitt! (1997–98) as Johnny Johnstone
 Children’s Hospital (Australian TV series) (1998) as Surgical Specialist
 All Saints (1999 & 2009) as Walter Elliott & Russell Woods
 Escape of the Artful Dodger (2001) as Father O’Brien
 Backberner (2002) as Henry Tinkwhistle
 Farscape (2002) as Jabula, Clan Chieftain
 Rake (2010) as Judge Keddie

Sources
 filmreference.com

References

1939 births
Living people
Male actors from Adelaide
Australian male film actors
Australian male radio actors
Australian male stage actors
Australian male television actors
National Institute of Dramatic Art alumni
20th-century Australian male actors
21st-century Australian male actors